Alexander Masucci (born November 11, 1949) is an American music executive, record producer, songwriter and promoter.

Biography
Alex Masucci was born and raised in Brooklyn, New York. His brother is the late Jerry Masucci, an attorney, music executive and co-founder of Fania Records. Masucci attended Universidad de las Américas, A.C. in Mexico City. He began working part-time at Fania Records as a teenager. He also jointly established A&R Film Distributors in 1972 with Ray Aviles and distributed Fania Records' film, Our Latin Thing. He subsequently worked at Island Records, Boardwalk Records, PolyGram and became the President of Island Records Latin music label in Miami. Since then he has formed his own companies, Masucci Entertainment and Haz-Mat Entertainment.

Early life
Masucci was born on November 11, 1949, in Brooklyn, New York to Urbano and Elvira Masucci, both Italian immigrants. His brother Jerry Masucci founded the Latin music label Fania Records. Masucci started working for Fania Records at the age of 14 years old in 1964, helping deliver newly pressed records first by subway, and later from the back of his mother's automobile to record shops in Spanish Harlem, selling directly out of the back of the car. He attended college at Universidad de las Américas, A.C. in Mexico City from 1968 to 1972, earning a degree in Business Administration. During his college years, Masucci spent the summers working for Fania Records.

Career
After graduating from college, Masucci was handed two film canisters of the movie Our Latin Thing by his brother and told to form a company and distribute the film. This was the beginning of A&R Film Distributors, cofounded with partner Ray Aviles. A&R proceeded with four wall distribution in New York, Puerto Rico, Chicago, Venezuela, Panama and Colombia, handling advertising and distribution for Our Latin Thing. Following the film's release, Masucci helped produce live concerts for the Fania All-Stars. The first major concert was held at Yankee Stadium on Friday, August 24, 1973, and was attended by 45,000 people. The concert is included in the second set of 50 recordings preserved by the National Recording Registry. The second major concert was in 1974 featuring Celia Cruz performing with the Fania All Stars at the Stadu du Hai in Kinshasa, Zaire and attended by 80,000 people. In 1975, Fania Records produced two albums from the Yankee Stadium concert, Live at the Yankee Stadium Volumes 1&2, as well as a film of the live concert titled "Salsa." Masucci produced concerts around the country and at Madison Square Garden in 1975, 1976, 1977 and 1978. In 1978, Masucci worked at Island Records at the request of founder Chris Blackwell in order to head Island's Special Projects division. While there, Masucci signed and produced hit albums for Invisible Man's Band, including "All Night Thing," and Third World (band)'s hit single "Now That We Found Love." Masucci also coordinated production on the film featuring Third World (band) titled "Prisoner in the Street." He was also instrumental in orchestrating the breakthrough of Bob Marley into urban radio in the United States. During that time, Masucci and Clarence Burke Jr., formerly of the Five Stairsteps and lead singer of the "Invisible Man's Band," cowrote and produced most of the songs on both "Invisible Man's Band" albums. In 1981, music and film industry visionary Neil Bogart urged Masucci to join his label Boardwalk Records. Masucci and Burke Jr. had previously formed Seduction Productions and agreed to sign with Boardwalk, joining a group of artists including Joan Jett, Ringo Starr and Curtis Mayfield.

In 1997, Chris Blackwell again reached out to Masucci and asked him to head his new Latin music label, Island Miami. Masucci accepted. After Blackwell's departure from Island/PolyGram, Blackwell and Masucci signed a joint venture between Masucci Entertainment and Blackwell's newly formed Palm Pictures, signing Cuban artist Carlos Manuel y su Clan. Masucci was executive producer on the album released in 2001. Masucci has recently formed Haz-Mat Entertainment, and is developing film and music projects, as well as a documentary on the history of Fania Records

Discography
Production
•Bobby Rodriguez y La Comp, Vaya Records, 1975, Producer
•Bobby Rodriguez Live at Woodstock, Vaya Records, 1976, Producer
•Bobby Rodriguez Latin from Manhattan, Vaya Records, 1976, Producer
•Bobby Rodriguez, Lead Me to that Beautiful Band, 1977, Producer
•Ricardo Marrero, Fania Records, 1977, Executive Producer
•77, Fuego, Alegre Records, 1978, Executive Producer
•All Night Thing, Island Records, 1979, Co-Producer
•Invisible Man's Band, Island Records, 1979,Co-Producer
•Really Wanna See U, Invisible Man's Band, Boardwalk Records, 1982, Co-Producer
•Sunday Afternoon, Invisible Man's Band, Move N Groove Records, 1983, Producer
•Calle Luna Calle Sol, Mangu, Island Miami, 1987, Co-Producer
•Flex, Polygram, 1998, Executive Producer
•Beethoven's 5th, Mark Diamond, Move N Groove Records, 1993, Executive Producer

Writer
"All Night Thing", Island Records, 1979, Co-Writer
"Rated X", Really Want to See U, 1982, Co-Writer
"X Country", Really Want to See U, 1982, Co-Writer
"Really Wanna See U", Really Want to See U, 1982, Co-Writer
"Party Time", Really Want to See U, 1982, Co-Writer
"Same Thing", Really Want to See U, 1982, Co-Writer

References

1949 births
Living people
Songwriters from New York (state)
Record producers from New York (state)